Parriott is a surname. Notable people with the surname include: 

Buddy Parriott, American motorcycle road racer
James D. Parriott (born 1950), American writer, director, and producer
Ruth Parriott, American businesswoman
Sam Parriott, American drag racer
Sara Parriott, American screenwriter